Desisa malaccensis is a species of beetle in the family Cerambycidae. It was described by Stephan von Breuning in 1938. It is known from Malaysia and Borneo.

References

Desisa
Beetles described in 1938
Beetles of Asia